Huérguina is a municipality in Cuenca, Castile-La Mancha, Spain. It has a population of 108.

Municipalities in the Province of Cuenca